Provision of education in the UAE began shortly after the establishment of the federation with the inception of the first university in Al Ain, Abu Dhabi, the United Arab Emirates University.  Since then, the country has progressed with efforts of ensuring high literacy rates, modern programs and women's share in education. It works on improving its youths education which is why the agenda 2021 has been set. The UAE currently devotes approximately 25 percent of total federal government spending to education. As of 2019, the overall literacy rate is 96%.

Basic education 

 	
In 2006, the United Nations Programme on Governance in the Arab Region rated the UAE a .79 on its Education Index. The Programme defines the Index as, "one of the three indices on which the human development index is built." It is based on the adult literacy rate and the combined gross enrollment ratio for primary, secondary and tertiary schools. Regionally, the countries scoring higher included the Occupied Palestinian Territories at .89; Libya, Lebanon and Kuwait at .87; Jordan and Bahrain at .86; and Saudi Arabia at .80. All of the countries ranked in the index reported a significantly higher number of phones per population than internet users, with the UAE claiming one hundred twenty eight versus twenty-nine. Internationally, the country with the highest rating was Australia with a .89 while Burkina Faso stood lowest at .27.

Despite not being among the highest rated on the Education Index, the UAE has made regionally significant achievements in ensuring women's access to education. UNDP's Millennium Development Goal No. 3, to "Promote Gender Equality and Empower Women" has reached its targeted levels of female participation in primary education and continues to increase. (See Women in the United Arab Emirates) In 1971 the rate of literacy for adult was 54% and 31% for woman.

Development program 
The Ministry of Education has adopted "Education 2021", a series of three-years plan designed to introduce advanced education techniques, improve innovative skills, and focus more on the self-learning abilities of students. As part of this program, an enhanced curriculum for mathematics and integrated science was introduced at first-grade level for the 2003–4 academic year in all government schools.

The UAE education system is divided into four tiers:

Kindergarten: KG 1 and KG 2 – 4–5 years old

Primary School: Grade 1–6 – 6–11 years old

Preparatory Stage: Grade 7–9 – 12–14 years old

Secondary School: Grade 10–12 – 15–17 years old

Recognizing a constant need for progress, the UAE has sought to implement and monitor high quality education standards by undertaking new policies, programs and initiatives. Throughout the Middle East, educational advancement is often impeded by insufficient focus on the English language, inadequate provision of technology as well as modern techniques of instruction and methodology. Stressing the importance of "modern curricula with assorted and non-monotonous means of training and evaluation", the Emirates launched ambitious campaigns to develop each of these areas. At its foundation, lies the necessary funding, which in 2009 was earmarked at 7.4 billion dirhams ($2 billion), as well as increased teacher training. Through its Teachers of the 21st Century and a two hundred million dirham share of this budget, the UAE hopes to train 10,000 public school teachers within the next five years, while also pursuing its scheduled goal of reaching 90% Emiratisation of its staff by 2020.

In addition, the UAE government believes that a poor grasp of English is one of the main employment barriers for UAE nationals; as a first remedial step, the Abu Dhabi Education Council has developed the New School Model, a critical-thinking oriented curriculum modeled on that of New South Wales.  This program was unveiled in September, 2010.  In February 2006, the prime minister directed the education minister to take initial steps toward improving the quality of education, including the provision of permanent classrooms, computer laboratories, and modern facilities. In April 2007, however, in a major policy speech to the nation, the UAE vice president and prime minister stated that despite the steady increase in the education budget over the previous 20 years, teaching methods and curricula were obsolete, and the education system as a whole was weak. He demanded that the ministers of education and higher education work to find innovative and comprehensive solutions.

In early 2008, the UAE's Ministry of Education launched a Mentoring Programme which assigns Western principals to 50 of 735 public schools across the UAE in an effort to modernize instructional strategies and implement Western methods of learning. Participating instructors emphasize necessity of deviating from the traditional methods of passive memorization and rote learning instead of encouraging active student participation.

The Abu Dhabi Education Council (ADEC) has signed agreements with organizations like the International Baccalaureate Organization as part of their efforts to widen the options and meet the needs of students.

Higher education 
At the tertiary level, numerous institutions are available to the student body. In 1976, the United Arab Emirates University (UAEU) was established in Al Ain in Abu Dhabi Emirate. Consisting of nine colleges, it was considered by the UAE government to be the leading teaching and research institution in the country. More than 14,000 students were enrolled at UAEU in the first semester of the academic year 2006–7.

In 1988, the first four Higher Colleges of Technology (HCT) were opened, in Abu Dhabi and Al Ain. By the academic year 2014–15, 17 campuses offered more than 75 programs, with a combined enrollment of more than 17,000 men and women. The commercial arm of the HCT, the Centre of Excellence for Applied Research and Training, is allied with multinational companies to provide training courses and professional development. In 1998, Zayed University was opened, initially for women only, with campuses in Abu Dhabi and Dubai. A US $100.7 million purpose-built campus in Dubai opened in 2006. Zayed University accepted select groups of male students starting in 2008, and now has a significant number of male students.

The Dubai Pharmacy College is UAE's first Pharmacy college started in 1992 in Dubai. It offers both B.Pharm and M.Pharm (Clinical Pharmacy) degree that is accredited by the Ministry of Education and CAA.

American University in Dubai opened its doors in 1995 to join the successful ranks of its much older regional counterparts in Cairo and Beirut. Dubai is a center for several international universities, including branches of the U.S.-based universities Michigan State University and Rochester Institute of Technology. Another institution based on American-style higher education, the American University in the Emirates opened in 2006. Through free zones designated for educational institutions (Dubai International Academic City and Dubai Knowledge Village), Dubai also hosts many universities from other countries, including India, Pakistan, and the U.K.

In Abu Dhabi, New York Institute of Technology (NYIT) opened the first branch of an accredited U.S. university in 2005. Another New York-based institution, New York University (NYU), accepted its first class of students to its Abu Dhabi campus in fall 2010. After seven hundred years and a very distinguished record in Paris, Université Paris-Sorbonne opened its first campus abroad in Abu Dhabi in 2006. Although its focus is largely on the arts and humanities, Emirati students attending international universities locally commonly prefer business, science, engineering and computers programs.

The UAE's first medical school, Gulf Medical University, opened in 1998 in the Emirate of Ajman. It welcomes both genders and all nationalities. Originally known as Gulf Medical College, it expanded in 2008 to include dentistry, pharmacy and other programs in association with the Royal Australian College of General Practitioners.

UAE's first Canadian university outside Canada was opened in Dubai. Canadian University Dubai offers Canadian-based curriculum accredited by ministry of higher education. 

In 2003 Dubai established a dedicated education zone, Dubai Knowledge Village. The 1 km long campus brings together globally recognized international universities, training centers, e-learning, and research and development companies in one location. As of early 2007, it had attracted 16 international university partners, which include Saint-Petersburg State, University of Engineering and Economics, University of Wollongong, Mahatma Gandhi University, and the Manchester Business School. Some of these institutions have since moved to a larger free zone in Dubai, Dubai International Academic City.

The Ministry of Higher Education and Scientific Research is the government ministry concerned with higher education. The Commission for Academic Accreditation (CAA), a department in the Ministry, licenses institutions and accredits degree programmes. Institutions based in free zones do not need to seek CAA approval.

International education 
As of January 2015, the International Schools Consultancy listed the UAE as having 507 international schools. The consultancy defines an 'international school' in the following terms "ISC includes an international school if the school delivers a curriculum to any combination of pre-school, primary or secondary students, wholly or partly in English outside an English-speaking country, or if a school in a country where English is one of the official languages, offers an English-medium curriculum other than the country's national curriculum and is international in its orientation." This definition is used by publications including The Economist. Of these schools over 35 offer one or more of the four International Baccalaureate Programmes.

Technical and Special Education 
The UAE has technical educational centers such as The Higher Colleges of Technology's Center of Excellence for Applied Research and Training (CERT). CERT offers technology programs. The UAE signed the UN Convention on the Rights of Persons with Disabilities.  the emirate of Abu Dhabi has partnered with the Massachusetts' New England Center for Children, specialised in assisting autistic children.

See also 

 List of schools in the United Arab Emirates
 List of universities in the United Arab Emirates
 Education in Abu Dhabi
 Education in Dubai
 University of Wollongong in Dubai

References

External links 
 Search Training Providers in UAE | Coursetakers.ae
 Public School Insights interview with UAE Education Minister Dr Hanif Hassan Posted October 6, 2008
UAE Commission for Academic Accreditation licensed institutions data
UAE MOE education in the UAE
UAE MOHESR Higher Education summary
UNESCO education in the UAE